Mabasa may be,
Ignatius Mabasa (born 1971), Zimbabwean author
Noria Mabasa (born 1938), South African women artist
a district in Dupax del Norte, Philippines